Angelique Widjaja (born 12 December 1984) is a retired Indonesian professional tennis player. She won the junior championships at Wimbledon in 2001, defeating Dinara Safina. She reached a peak of No. 55 in the WTA singles rankings in March 2003, and a peak of No. 15 in the doubles rankings in February 2004. She retired in 2008.

Career
Widjaja started playing tennis at the age of four. She first began playing at ITF juniors events in 1998 at the age of 13. Her first professional event was an event in Jakarta in April 1999, when she was 14 years old.

She enjoyed considerable success as a junior player. In 2001, she won the singles competition of the junior championships at Wimbledon, defeating Dinara Safina 6–4, 0–6, 7–5. In so doing, she became the first Indonesian to win any title at Wimbledon. In 2002, she won the doubles competition of the Australian Open Junior Championships, partnered by Gisela Dulko. That year, she also won the singles competition of the junior championships at the French Open. She reached a peak junior rank of No. 2. Also, she obtained an invite from "Hong Kong Tennis Patrons' Association" to play The Hong Kong Ladies Challenge in January 2002.

The first WTA Tour tournament she won was the 2001 Wismilak International in Bali, a Tier III event, which she entered at the age of 16 on a wildcard. She was the youngest Indonesian ever to win a WTA singles title. Her WTA singles rank prior to the tournament was No. 579, and as such was the lowest-ranked player ever to win a WTA singles title.

2002 was her most successful year in Grand Slam singles competition, reaching the second round at three consecutive majors. At the French Open, she defeated Jill Craybas in the first round. She was beaten by Evie Dominikovic in the second round. At Wimbledon, she beat 15th seed Anna Smashnova in the first round, before losing to Meilen Tu in round two. At the US Open, she beat Anna Kournikova in the first round, and was eliminated in the next round by Stéphanie Foretz.

Widjaja represented Indonesia at the 2002 Asian Games in Busan, collecting a silver medal in the women's doubles with partner Wynne Prakusya, and also the gold medal in the team event.

In November 2002, she won a second WTA tournament, the Tier V event at Pattaya.

She continued to perform well in the WTA tour through 2003. After her third round exit from the Tier I tournament at Indian Wells in 2003, she reached her career's highest rank: No. 55. She remained in the top 100 for the remainder of 2003.

From 2003 to 2004, Widjaja enjoyed considerable success in doubles competition, primarily partnered by María Vento-Kabchi. The pair reached the quarterfinals at Wimbledon and the US Open in 2003, and the Australian Open and Wimbledon in 2004. They also won a Tier III WTA Tour event at Bali in 2003, and reached the final of one Tier I event, the 2003 Canada Masters. Following the 2004 Australian Open, Widjaja reached No. 15 in the WTA doubles rankings. This was her peak doubles rank.

Through 2004, Widjaja appeared in the mixed-doubles competition of all four majors. Her best result came at the French Open, where she and partner Lucas Arnold Ker beat Leander Paes and Martina Navratilova to reach the quarterfinals. There, they lost to the French pair Tatiana Golovin and Richard Gasquet.

Widjaja played at the 2004 Summer Olympics at Athens. She defeated Tamarine Tanasugarn in the first round of the singles competition, but was beaten by Karolina Šprem in the second round. She also took part in the doubles competition, partnered by Wynne Prakusya, and they were eliminated in the first round.

Through 2005, Widjaja took a hiatus from professional tennis due to various injuries. Following her return in 2006, she did not replicate her previous success, and did not take part in any singles competitions in WTA or ITF events after that year, but did remain active in doubles competition.

In 2007, she was part of the Indonesian women's team that won the silver medal at the Southeast Asian Games in Thailand.

In 2008, at the age of 23, Widjaja and partner Liza Andriyani won the doubles competition of an ITF tournament in Jakarta. This would be Widjaja's last tournament, as shortly afterwards she announced that she was quitting the professional tour, saying she was burnt out by the injuries and travel requirements.

During her professional career, Widjaja had recorded wins over several prominent players including Dinara Safina, Jelena Janković, Alicia Molik, Anna Smashnova, Anna Kournikova and Tamarine Tanasugarn. She was mainly coached by Meiske H. Wiguna and Deddy Tedjamukti.

Also, she was part of the Indonesia Fed Cup team in 2001, 2002, 2003, 2004 and 2006.

Awards
 Achievement Award 2001 – the Asian Tennis Federation
 The Best Women Athlete of Indonesia 2001 – RCTI

WTA career finals

Singles: 2 (2 titles)

Doubles: 6 (2 titles, 4 runner-ups)

ITF Circuit finals

Singles: 2 (1 title, 1 runner-up)

Doubles: 8 (6 titles, 2 runner-ups)

Junior Grand Slam finals

Singles: 2 (2 titles)

Doubles: 1 (1 title)

ITF Junior finals

Singles: 10 (8 titles, 2 runner-ups)

Doubles: 17 (4 titles, 2 runners-up)

Edited in progress

National representation

Multi-sports event 
Widjaja made her debut representing Indonesia in multi-sports event at the 2002 Asian Games, she won the women's team gold medal and women's doubles silver medal. In 2007, she won the women's team silver medal at the 2007 Southeast Asian Games.

Doubles: 1 (1 silver)

Team: 2 (1 gold, 1 silver)

Performance timelines

Singles

1 Includes ITF tournaments.
2 The sum of wins/losses by year records from the WTA website does not add up to the career record presented on the same website.

Doubles

1 Includes ITF tournaments.
2 The sum of wins/losses by year records from the WTA website does not add up to the career record presented on the same website.

Mixed doubles

References

External links
 
 
 
 Angelique Widjaja Turnamen Pembuka 2003 

1984 births
Living people
Sportspeople from Bandung
Indonesian Christians
Indonesian sportspeople of Chinese descent
Indonesian female tennis players
Tennis players at the 2004 Summer Olympics
Olympic tennis players of Indonesia
Asian Games medalists in tennis
Wimbledon junior champions
Grand Slam (tennis) champions in girls' singles
Grand Slam (tennis) champions in girls' doubles
Tennis players at the 2002 Asian Games
Tennis players at the 2006 Asian Games
Asian Games gold medalists for Indonesia
Asian Games silver medalists for Indonesia
Medalists at the 2002 Asian Games
Southeast Asian Games silver medalists for Indonesia
Southeast Asian Games medalists in tennis
Competitors at the 2007 Southeast Asian Games